Lord Derby's parakeet (Psittacula derbiana), also known as Derbyan parakeet, is a parrot species, which is confined to a small pocket of moist evergreen forest in the hills and mountains of the Indian states of Arunachal Pradesh and Assam, and adjoining parts of Tibet, Sichuan and Yunnan in China. The species suffers from cutting of old trees (important for nesting sites) and poaching for the illegal wildlife trade. In 2011, its status was updated from least concern to near threatened on the IUCN Red List. The adult male and female are easily distinguished because they have different beak colours and slightly different plumage.

The name of this bird commemorates Edward Stanley, 13th Earl of Derby.

Lord Derby's parakeets feed on fruits, berries, seeds, and leaf buds, occasionally foraging in gardens and fields.

Description

They have a mostly green plumage over their dorsal surface (i.e. from behind), black lores and lower cheeks, a bluish-purple crown and pale yellow eyes. The throat, breast, abdomen and under-wing coverts are greyish blue to lavender. The thighs and vent area are yellowish green with blue edging on some of the feathers. The tail feathers are shades of green, some edged with blue. Male birds have a red upper mandible with a yellow tip, while the lower mandible is black. The females have an all-black beak.

Immature Lord Derby's parakeets are duller in colour than the adults. Juvenile birds have green crowns, orange-red upper and lower mandible (beak), and their irises are dark and do not lighten until they reach maturity between two and three years of age.

Sexual dimorphism

Reproduction

Breeding season usually begins between April and June. The female lays a clutch of two to four eggs in nest holes of trees. The young hatch after an incubation period of about 23 days and will fledge after 8 to 9 weeks.

References

External links
World Parrot Trust Parrot Encyclopedia - Species Profiles
Lord Derby's parakeets in capital of Tibet
Derbyan pictures and links
BirdLife Species Factsheet
Oriental Bird Images: Derbyan parakeet   Selected photos
 http://animal-world.com/encyclo/birds/parakeets/DerbyanParakeet.php#
 http://home.wanadoo.nl/psittaculaworld/PsittaculaWorld.htm
 https://web.archive.org/web/20070606112952/http://www.ruffledfeathersaviary.com/derbyan_photos.htm

Lord Derby's parakeet
Birds of Northeast India
Birds of Tibet
Birds of Central China
Birds of Yunnan
Lord Derby's parakeet
Lord Derby's parakeet